{{DISPLAYTITLE:Phi1 Pavonis}}

Phi1 Pavonis, latinized from φ1 Pavonis, is a single star in the southern constellation of Pavo. It has a yellow-white hue and is faintly visible to the naked eye with an apparent visual magnitude of 4.75. It is drifting closer to the Sun with a radial velocity of −20 km/s.

This is an ordinary F-type main-sequence star with a stellar classification of F0V. It has 1.5 times the mass of the Sun and 1.8 times the Sun's radius. This is a young star, perhaps 30 million years old, and has a high rate of spin with a projected rotational velocity of 150 km/s. It is radiating 8.2 times the luminosity of the Sun from its photosphere at an effective temperature of 7,209 K.

Phi1 Pavonis is a candidate debris disk star, although Gray et al. (2006) reported a non-detection of an infrared excess. Nilsson et al.

References

F-type main-sequence stars
Pavo (constellation)
Pavonis, Phi1
Durchmusterung objects
195627
101612
7848